Apelastoneurus is a genus of flies in the family Dolichopodidae. It includes 47 species from Africa formerly placed in Paracleius or Pelastoneurus (the former is now a synonym of the latter).

Species

Apelastoneurus abstrusus (Grichanov, 2004)
Apelastoneurus aeptus (Grichanov, 2004)
Apelastoneurus afromaculatus (Dyte & Smith, 1980)
Apelastoneurus altimontanus (Grichanov, 2004)
Apelastoneurus ambiguus (Parent, 1934)
Apelastoneurus basilewskyi (Vanschuytbroeck, 1964)
Apelastoneurus bequaerti (Curran, 1929)
Apelastoneurus biadimbi (Grichanov, 2004)
Apelastoneurus bissindza (Grichanov, 2004)
Apelastoneurus bretoni (Grichanov, 2004)
Apelastoneurus bururi (Grichanov, 2004)
Apelastoneurus capensis (Parent, 1932)
Apelastoneurus collarti (Curran, 1927)
Apelastoneurus confusibilis (Parent, 1937)
Apelastoneurus congoensis (Parent, 1933)
Apelastoneurus dedegwa (Grichanov, 2004)
Apelastoneurus dobronosovi (Grichanov, 2004)
Apelastoneurus donskoffi (Grichanov, 2004)
Apelastoneurus emasculatus (Parent, 1937)
Apelastoneurus gabonensis (Grichanov, 2004)
Apelastoneurus gracilis (Curran, 1924)
Apelastoneurus ineditus (Parent, 1933)
Apelastoneurus julius (Grichanov, 2004)
Apelastoneurus kassebeeri (Grichanov, 2004)
Apelastoneurus latipennis (Parent, 1931)
Apelastoneurus leidenrothi (Grichanov, 2004)
Apelastoneurus lippensi (Grichanov, 2004)
Apelastoneurus machakos (Grichanov, 2004)
Apelastoneurus microproctus (Parent, 1933)
Apelastoneurus micrurus (Parent, 1933)
Apelastoneurus miripennis (Grichanov, 2004)
Apelastoneurus mottusi (Grichanov, 1999)
Apelastoneurus naglisi (Grichanov, 2004)
Apelastoneurus nebulo (Parent, 1933)
Apelastoneurus neocongoensis (Grichanov, 2004)
Apelastoneurus nigeriensis (Grichanov, 2004)
Apelastoneurus nigripalpis (Grichanov, 2004)
Apelastoneurus olejniceki (Grichanov, 2004)
Apelastoneurus pectinifer (Parent, 1934)
Apelastoneurus pedunculatus (Parent, 1933)
Apelastoneurus reavelli (Grichanov, 2004)
Apelastoneurus schoutedeni (Curran, 1927)
Apelastoneurus solivagus (Lamb, 1922)
Apelastoneurus vilkamaai (Grichanov, 2004)
Apelastoneurus whittingtoni (Grichanov, 2004)
Apelastoneurus zamotailovi (Grichanov, 2004)
Apelastoneurus zonatus (Parent, 1931)

References

Dolichopodidae genera
Dolichopodinae
Diptera of Africa